The Ameralik Span is the longest span of an electrical overhead power line in the world. It was built in 1993 by the Norwegian company NTE Entreprise (Nord-Trøndelag Elektrisitetsverk) and is part of a single-circuit 132 kV powerline running from Buksefjord hydroelectric power plant to Nuuk.

The span consists of four steel conductors of 40 millimeters diameter whereby one is a spare conductor. The span has a width of 190 metres and a minimum clearance of 128 metres. The pylons on each side of the span carry only one conductor each and are situated on mountains 444 metres high on the north and 1,013 metres at the south shore. It is designed to withstand the cold winters of Greenland, so electricity produced can reach consumers without any disturbance.

Sites

North End 
 Tower 1: 
 Tower 2: 
 Tower 3: 
 Tower 4:

South End 
 Tower 1: 
 Tower 2: 
 Tower 3: 
 Tower 4:

See also

 List of spans

References
 https://web.archive.org/web/20120222110711/http://www015.upp.so-net.ne.jp/overhead-TML/shurui.html#longspanmap
 http://overhead-tml.net/shurui.html#chu-1

Towers completed in 1993
Powerline river crossings
Electric power infrastructure in Greenland